The 1916–17 season was Galatasaray SK's 12th in existence and the club's 8th consecutive season in the IFL.

Squad statistics

Competitions

İstanbul Football League

Standings

Matches

Friendly Matches
Kick-off listed in local time (EEST)

References
 Futbol, Galatasaray. Tercüman Spor Ansiklopedisi vol.2. (1981) (page 556)
 1916-1917 İstanbul Cuma Ligi. Türk Futbol Tarihi vol.1. page(42). (June 1992) Türkiye Futbol Federasyonu Yayınları.

External links
 Galatasaray Sports Club Official Website 
 Turkish Football Federation - Galatasaray A.Ş. 
 uefa.com - Galatasaray AŞ

Galatasaray S.K. (football) seasons
Turkish football clubs 1916–17 season
1910s in Istanbul